The 1994–1995 Highland Football League was won by Huntly. The league was reduced to sixteen teams after Ross County along with Caledonian and Inverness Thistle (as the newly formed Caledonian Thistle) left to join the Scottish Football League. Wick Academy, formerly of the North Caledonian Football League was elected in their place.

Table

Highland Football League seasons
5